"Gotta Love" is the debut single by American R&B group Jodeci. It is from their debut album Forever My Lady.  The song was released on February 24, 1991. The music video uses the "New R&B Edit" (or "New Video Edit") version of the song instead of the album version.

Track listing
US promo Vinyl and 12"

"Gotta Love" (New R&B Edit) - 4:19
"Gotta Love" (New Video Edit) - 4:11
"Gotta Love" (Swing Act) - 5:36
"Gotta Love" (Hip Hop) - 5:34
"Gotta Love" (Daddy Hip Hop) - 4:45
"Gotta Love" (12" Edit) - 6:45

Personnel
Information taken from Discogs.
engineering: Paul Logus, Mike Mangini
production: DeVante Swing
remixing: DeVante Swing, Puff Daddy
K-Ci Hailey - Lead & Background vocals
JoJo Hailey - Background vocals
DeVante Swing - Rap and Background vocals
Mr. Dalvin - Background vocals

Chart performance

Notes

External links

1991 debut singles
Jodeci songs
Song recordings produced by DeVante Swing
1991 songs
Uptown Records singles
Songs written by DeVante Swing
Songs written by K-Ci